Tinnahinch may refer to:

Places in Ireland
Graiguenamanagh, a town on the Carlow-Kilkenny border, the Carlow side of which is referred to as Tinnahinch
Tinnahinch (barony), a barony in County Laois

Organisations
Tinnahinch GAA, a defunct Gaelic Athletic Association (GAA) club based in Clonaslee, County Laois